Mediator of RNA polymerase II transcription subunit 1 also known as DRIP205 or Trap220 is a subunit of the Mediator complex and is a protein that in humans is encoded by the MED1 gene. MED1 functions as a nuclear receptor coactivator.

Function 

The activation of gene transcription is a multistep process that is triggered by factors that recognize transcriptional enhancer sites in DNA. These factors work with co-activators to direct transcriptional initiation by the RNA polymerase II apparatus. The mediator of RNA polymerase II transcription subunit 1 protein is a subunit of the CRSP (cofactor required for SP1 activation) complex, which, along with TFIID, is required for efficient activation by SP1. This protein is also a component of other multisubunit complexes [e.g., thyroid hormone receptor-(TR-) associated proteins that interact with TR and facilitate TR function on DNA templates in conjunction with initiation factors and cofactors]. It also regulates p53-dependent apoptosis and it is essential for adipogenesis. This protein is known to have the ability to self-oligomerize.

Interactions 

MED1 has been shown to interact with:

 Androgen receptor, 
 BRCA1, 
 Calcitriol receptor,
 Cyclin-dependent kinase 8, 
 Estrogen receptor alpha, 
 Glucocorticoid receptor, 
 Hepatocyte nuclear factor 4 alpha, 
 P53, 
 PPARGC1A, 
 PPARG, 
 TGS1,  and
 Thyroid hormone receptor alpha.

Protein family 

This entry represents subunit Med1 of the Mediator complex. The Med1 forms part of the Med9 submodule of the Srb/Med complex. It is one of three subunits essential for viability of the whole organism via its role in environmentally-directed cell-fate decisions.

References

Further reading 

 
 
 
 
 
 
 
 
 
 
 
 
 
 
 
 
 
 

Protein domains
Transcription coregulators